The Historical Plague is a collector's vinyl boxed set by the black metal band Old Man's Child, limited to 2000 copies. It was released on 8 December 2003 by Century Media Records. It contained remastered Gatefold Vinyl LP versions of the five Studio Albums that Old Man's Child had released up to 2003: Born of the Flickering (1996), The Pagan Prosperity (1997), Ill-Natured Spiritual Invasion (1998), Revelation 666 - The Curse of Damnation (2000) and In Defiance of Existence (2003).

Track listing
1996 - Born of the Flickering
"Demons of the Thorncastle" – 4:47
"Swallowed by a Buried One" – 4:51
"Born of the Flickering" – 5:05
"King of the Dark Ages" – 5:27
"Wounds From the Night of Magic" – 3:28
"On Through the Desert Storm" – 4:20
"Christian Death" – 4:55
"Funeral, Swords and Souls" – 4:56
"The Last Chapter" – 4:42
"...Leads to Utopia/The Old Man's Dream" – 8:44

1997 - The Pagan Prosperity
"The Millennium King" – 5:28
"Behind the Mask" – 3:58
"Soul Possessed" – 4:04
"My Demonic Figures" – 3:59
"Doommaker" – 3:39
"My Kingdom Will Come" – 4:35
"Return of the Night Creatures" – 5:36
"What Malice Embrace" – 5:13

1998 - Ill-Natured Spiritual Invasion
"Towards Eternity" – 5:17
"The Dream Ghost" – 3:41
"Demoniacal Possession" – 3:31
"Fall of Man" – 4:00
"Captives of Humanity" – 4:42
"God of Impiety" – 5:23
"My Evil Revelations" – 3:59
"Thy Servant" – 4:46

2000 - Revelation 666 - The Curse of Damnation
"Phantoms of Mortem Tales" – 5:35
"Hominis Nocturna" – 5:22
"In Black Endless Void" – 4:27
"Unholy Vivid Innocence" – 5:06
"Passage to Pandemonium" – 4:13
"Obscure Divine Manifestation" – 4:20
"World Expiration" – 6:06
"Into Silence Embrace" – 5:02

2003 - In Defiance of Existence
"Felonies Of The Christian Art" – 5:48
"Agony Of Fallen Grace" – 4:28
"Black Seeds On Virgin Soil" – 4:57
"In Defiance Of Existence" – 4:56
"Sacrifice Of Vengeance" – 4:31
"The Soul Receiver" – 4:31
"In Quest Of Enigmatic Dreams" – 0:52
"The Underworld Domains" – 4:48
"Life Deprived" – 4:49

Personnel

Additional personnel
 Christophe Szpajdel — logo

References

2003 compilation albums
Old Man's Child albums